Varadaraja Perumal temple (also called Vedapureswarar - Varadharajar Temple) in the South Indian union territory of Puducherry, is dedicated to the Hindu god Vishnu. It is located heritage town region of the city. Constructed in the Dravidian style of architecture, the temple is a storehouse of Chola architecture.

A granite wall surrounds the temple, enclosing all its shrines. The temple has a five-tiered rajagopuram, the temple's gateway tower. The temple is originally believed to have been built by the Cholas during the 11th century, with later expansion from the Pandyas.

The temple follows Vaikasana Agama tradition of worship. Four daily rituals and three yearly festivals are held at the temple, of which the ten-day annual Brahmostavam during the Tamil month of Chittirai (April - May) and five-day Pavitrotsavam during Avani (August - September) and 25-day Ramar festival during chittirai being the most prominent. The temple is maintained and administered by the Archaeological Survey of India as a protected monument.

History

The temple is originally believed to be built by the later Cholas and subsequently by the Pandyas from the 12th century. The regions changed hands from British to French colonial Empire during the 17th century. Most temples in the place were destroyed during the French invasion, but the temple was spared. The temple housed the images of the Vedapureeswarar Temple during the destruction by the French troops during 1748. The temple was also guarded from the invading Muslim troops. The images of Rama, Sita, Hanuman, Navaneethakrishnan, Santhanakrishnan and Venugopalan were dug out from Vaithikupam in 1902 and subsequently housed in the temple. It is believed that Vasantha Mandapam was built by a Muslim.

Architecture

The sanctum houses the image of Varadaraja Perumal in standing posture  is made of granite sporting four arms. Two of his arms hold the conch and Chakra, while the other two sport Abayamudra and Kadahasta. The images of Sridevi and Bhudevi are located on either of his sides. The festive image is called Srinivasan and the image has identical features as that of the presiding deity. The Ardha mandapa is guarded by two Dwarapalas on either sides. There is a separate shrine of Perundevi in the second precinct, which also houses the festival image. There is a mirror hall in the temple adjacent to the sanctum. There are paintings done in modern days around the walls of the precinct showing the 108 Divya Desams. There are separate shrines for Vaishana Gurus like Nikamanda Mahadesikan and Manavalamamunigal. The temple has 83 springs in the temple tanks and 12 bodies of water. The water in the temple tank is considered to be medicinal and devotees take a dip to cure themselves of common ailments.

Festival and religious importance

The temple does not differentiate between Thenkalai and Vadakalai sects of Vaishnavite tradition and follows Pancharathra aagama. In modern times, the temple priests perform the pooja (rituals) during festivals and on a daily basis. The temple rituals are performed four times a day: Kalasanthi at 8:00 a.m., Uchikalam at 12:00 p.m., Sayarakshai at 5:00 p.m., and Sayarakshai at 8:00 p.m. Each ritual has three steps: alangaram (decoration), neivethanam (food offering) and deepa aradanai (waving of lamps) for both Varadaraja Perumal and Perundevi. There are weekly, monthly and fortnightly rituals performed in the temple. The major festivals in the temple are the ten day annual Brahmostavam during the Tamil month of Chittirai (April - May) and five day Pavitrotsavam during Avani (August - September) and 25 day Ramar festival during chittirai. During the Ramanavami festival, the festive images of Rama, Sita, Lakshmana and Hanuman are taken around the streets of the temple in the temple chariot drawn by thousands of devotees.

Annaprasanam, a practise of making the infants write their first alphabet in a plate of rice, is a ritual practised in the temple by devotees. The temple is maintained and administered by the Government of Puducherry The temple is the Abimana temple of Devanathaswamy temple in Thiruvanthipuram.

References

External links

Archaeological sites in Pondicherry
Vishnu temples
Hindu temples in Puducherry